Choe Kwang-shik (born 1953) is a South Korean historian and museum curator who served as the Minister of Culture, Sports and Tourism under President Lee Myung-bak.

Biography
Choe Kwang-shik was born in 1953 in Seoul. He received his PhD in Korean history from Korea University, and in 1995 became a professor of the same university's history department. From 2004 to 2007, he was vice-president of the Korean Association of University Museums (KAUM).

In 2009, Choe became South Korea's Minister of Culture, Sports and Tourism. In January 2012, he unveiled plans to allocate more funds in cooperation with other governmental organizations to boost South Korea's cultural industry.

In 2013, Choe stepped down from his position as Minister of Culture, with Yoo Jin-ryong taking over.

References

External links 
 

1953 births
Living people
Government ministers of South Korea
Korea University alumni
Academic staff of Korea University